Eupogonius pauper is a species of beetle in the family Cerambycidae. It was described by John Lawrence LeConte in 1852. It is known from the United States.

References

Eupogonius
Beetles described in 1852